The 2023 EchoPark Automotive Grand Prix is an upcoming NASCAR Cup Series race that will be held on March 26, 2023, at Circuit of the Americas in Austin, Texas. It is contested over 68 laps on the 3.426-mile (5.514 km) road course, it will be the sixth race of the 2023 NASCAR Cup Series season.

Report

Background

Circuit of the Americas (COTA) is a grade 1 FIA-specification motorsports facility located within the extraterritorial jurisdiction of Austin, Texas. It features a  road racing circuit.  The facility is home to the Formula One United States Grand Prix, and the Motorcycle Grand Prix of the Americas, a round of the FIM Road Racing World Championship. It previously hosted the Supercars Championship, the FIA World Endurance Championship, the IMSA SportsCar Championship, and IndyCar Series.

Entry list
 (R) denotes rookie driver.
 (i) denotes driver who is ineligible for series driver points.

Media

Television
Fox Sports will cover the race on the television side. Mike Joy, Clint Bowyer, Kurt Busch, and Haas F1 Team Principal Guenther Steiner will call the race from the broadcast booth. Jamie Little and Regan Smith will handle pit road for the television side, and Larry McReynolds will provide insight from the Fox Sports studio in Charlotte.

Radio
PRN will have the radio call for the race which was simulcasted on Sirius XM NASCAR Radio.

References

EchoPark Automotive Grand Prix
Circuit of the Americas
EchoPark Automotive Grand Prix
NASCAR races at Circuit of the Americas
EchoPark Automotive Grand Prix